Mitmita is a powdered seasoning mix used in Ethiopia. It is orange-red in color and contains ground African bird's eye chili peppers, Ethiopian cardamom (korerima), cloves, and salt. It occasionally has other spices including cinnamon, cumin, and ginger.

The mixture is used to season the raw beef dish kitfo and may also be sprinkled on ful medames (fava beans). In addition, mitmita may be presented as a condiment and sprinkled on other delicacies or spooned onto a piece of injera, so that morsels may be lightly dipped into it.

See also
 Berbere, another Ethiopian spice mixture

References

Ethiopian cuisine
Herb and spice mixtures

am:ሚጥሚጣ